The Dust Palace is a circus theatre company based in Auckland, New Zealand. It was co-founded by actors Eve Gordon and Mike Edward in 2009.

The Dust Palace performs original devised works incorporating traditional theatre, physical theatre, dance and circus arts.

History 
In 2009 Eve Gordon created a fringe burlesque show Burlesque As You Like It: Not A Family Show which questioned the place of burlesque in contemporary society and engaged with its political and theatrical beginnings. The company was formed with members of the cast and crew following the success of this show.

Being invited to open Q Theatre’s Loft space in 2011 was a notable step forward in their journey. For this they chose to develop Venus Is... which follows the conversation and corresponding reverie, between an older couple trying to figure out when they stopped being real with one another.

"As one of the people said after the show, “I pity the next group using this space, ‘cos how is anyone going to be able to beat that?" Sharu Delilkan, Theatre Scenes

The Dust Palace's next significant step was the show Love and Money, devised from the real-life experiences and writings of director Mike Edward. This show was developed for the Hastings Opera House in 2011, re-developed for TAPAC Theatre Auckland 2012, and again in 2013 for Downstage theatre, Wellington. The show placed the circus work primarily within the context of a strip club, a setting which enabled a narrative flow, punchy dialogue and a bounty of physical comedy.

"There are not enough adjectives to describe the experience that is Love and Money. Breathtaking, beautiful, funny and poignant come to mind, but somehow words lack the required dimensions." Maryanne Cathro, Theatreview Wellington.

In 2012 the Dust Palace leased a warehouse in Auckland suburb Maungakiekie-Tamaki, Penrose which became their studio  and also houses The Dust Palace School which teaches circus skills to adults and children. A scholarship programme was started in 2014 to provide a year's worth of free classes for twelve young people.

By 2015, the company had toured with the South Island consortium taking ...with a stranger... to Oamaru, Ashburton and Nelson. Love and Money and Venus is... had performed at Erupt, the Lake Taupo Festival, and Cirque non Sequitur was staged at the Fuel Festival, Hamilton, at an independent season in Q, Auckland and at the Right Royal Cabaret Festival in Taranaki. Ready for new takes on how story and circus interact, they set about creating two new works: Top of the Heap and Ithaca. Top of the Heap, derived from a performance installation made at Splore, was set on a pile of (well-secured) furniture. The show’s unique storytelling was challenged and enhanced by the pathways the circus performers could take on the ‘set’. In contrast, Ithaca was an elaborate production: a cirque-musical re-telling of Homer’s epic narrative poem The Odyssey, told as a Space Opera.

During the research process for Venus is... in 2011 Eve had come across the narrative poem by Christina Rossetti, Goblin Market, and decided then that it was expansive enough to stage as circus theatre. In 2016 they began developing this work, a process that would take two years to fully satisfy their now more developed sense of telling a story via the spectacle of circus. We took The Goblin Market to OFF-CINARS, the world-renowned dance and circus-focused arts market in Montreal, the home of contemporary circus. The production, which involved considerable investment, was rewarded the following year, by being picked up for a season at The Cultch in Vancouver and at The Centaur in Montreal.

“With very few words, they captured some of the key themes of temptation, seduction, and redemption in beautiful, physically demanding circus performances. The moving balance beam, ropes, aerial hoop, and a stack of chairs all showcased the incredibly artistry of the three performers”Lauren Chancellor, The Review Weekly

“Breathtakingly beautiful. Heart-stoppingly romantic. Stirringly erotic” Jo Ledingham, joledingham.ca

After a performance for Lakeside Concert in Rotorua, The Auckland Philharmonia Orchestra approached The Dust Palace about a collaborative work which culminated in a sold out Kiri Te Kanawa Theatre, Aotea Centre for the show Midnight. The show was so successful that they instantly entered a bi-annual agreement for these large-scale works, contribution towards the show KiwiKapers, and various other youth engagement plans. Midnight was the beginning of a trilogy of works, set in the same world, and was followed by Dawn in 2019, filling an estimate of 4000 seats.

Also in 2017, The Dust Palace were approached at the event industry conference, Meetings, by Venues and Events Palmerston North about providing a show for their stadium in 2018. This again sparked a bi-annual collaboration with the production of Le Cirque Volé and subsequent engagement from all levels of the Manawatu community.

In 2019 the Dust Palace moved to a new, larger premises  with better facilities for creating circus theatre. It also being their ten year anniversary they decided to celebrate by programming a full year of our works; Angel for Breakfast debuted at Splore Festival; The Goblin Market went on tour; Human filled the ILT Stadium Southland twice in one day; they created and premiered Dawn; and The WonderWombs toured Nelson, Blenheim and Carterton, was brought back to Auckland and also picked up by The Cultch, Vancouver.

2020 pre-covid, saw The Dust Palace tour The WonderWombs to The Cultch in Vancouver and develop PULP for Hamilton Gardens Festival. Later in 2020, they re-developed Ithaca into the stadium scale requested by Venues and Events Palmerston North, marking their largest and most successful story-circus combination to date. 

2021 has seen the development of Haus of Yolo and The Ice Cream is Melting!, an environmentally focussed show for 4 - 8 year olds. 

 Productions Burlesque As You Like It: Not A Family Show (2009)The Moon's Insane and other stories... (2009)The Sexy Recession Cabaret (2009) (co-production)Love and Money (2010)Venus is... (2011)Cirque Non Sequitur (2012)...with a stranger... (2013)Same Same But Different (2013)Knock, Knock (2013)Top of the Heap (2015)Ithaca (2015)The Goblin Market (2016)Midnight (2017)Human (2018)The WonderWombs (2018)Dawn (2019)PULP (2020)Ithaca (2020)HAUS of YOLO (2021)The Ice Cream is Melting!'' (2021)

References

External links
 

2009 establishments in New Zealand
Performing groups established in 2009
Theatre companies in New Zealand
Circuses
Physical theatre